The Distress Act 1554 (1 & 2 Phil & Mary c 12) was an Act of the Parliament of England.

The words of commencement were repealed by section 1 of, and Schedule 1 to, the Statute Law Revision Act 1948.

The whole Act, so far as unrepealed, was repealed by section 1 of, and Part VII of the Schedule to, the Statute Law (Repeals) Act 1969.

Section 2
This section, from "further" to "aforesaid that" was repealed by section 1(1) of, and Part I of the Schedule to, the Statute Law Revision Act 1888.

Section 3
This section was repealed by section 1 of, and the Schedule to, the Statute Law Revision Act 1863.

References
Halsbury's Statutes,

Acts of the Parliament of England (1485–1603)
1554 in law
1554 in England